St Mary's Catholic School (formerly St Mary's Catholic Comprehensive School) is an English secondary school in Longbenton, Newcastle, England. In September 2013, following conversion to Academy, the 'Comprehensive' was officially removed from the school's name.

History 
St Mary's started life as a technical school for boys in 1954, and was located on the west side of Frederic Street (Rutherford Street not Frederic Street) (now a part of St. James' Boulevard), a short street between Bath Lane and Westgate Road in Newcastle until September 1966. It then moved to its current site in Benton Park Road in Longbenton where it continued to be a boys-only school until 1977. As a result of the re-organisation of Catholic Schools in 1977 St Mary's became a co-educational Catholic Comprehensive. The school was based on three sites, one in Longbenton, one in Walker and one in Killingworth.  These three sites were brought together some years later to its current site in Longbenton and is now the only Catholic co-educational secondary school in Newcastle.  The school is part of the family of Catholic schools in the Diocese of Hexham and Newcastle.

New School Building
New buildings for the school were completed in September 2011, including an atrium, the chapel, the main hall and sports facilities and so on. The original building was demolished and the site landscaped to provide a range of sports areas, a memorial garden, a wildlife area, and seating areas for students.

Achievements 
In July 2007 the school was awarded Humanities College status by the government, and given an additional £500,000 to develop further expertise in English, religious education and the performing arts.  The school has also been awarded the Arts Mark, and has the Healthy Schools Award.  Its website has also won the purpleyouth.com Bronze award for best school website.

Emblem, logos and identities 

The Fleur-de-lis contained within the arms of St Mary's is the symbol most commonly used by the school, and is used on letterheads and newsletters as the logo. The lily represents the Mother of God and the three castles represent the city of Newcastle upon Tyne. The present arms of the school were designed by the long serving ex Art teacher John Croney and replaced an earlier version. The motto of St Mary's is "Auxilium Christianorum" a title of the Blessed Virgin Mary from the Litany of Loretto.

Notable alumni

St Mary's RC Boys' Technical School
 Brian Chambers (footballer), former professional footballer.
 Bill Green (footballer), former professional footballer.
 Mick McGiven, former professional footballer.

References

External links
 St Mary's Catholic School Website
 BBC News Article - BBC News Article - St Mary's participation in Operation 60 GCSE.

Educational institutions established in 1954
Secondary schools in Newcastle upon Tyne
Catholic secondary schools in the Diocese of Hexham and Newcastle
1954 establishments in England
Academies in Newcastle upon Tyne